Albanians are an officially recognized ethnic minority in Serbia.

Geography
In the municipalities of Preševo and Bujanovac Albanians form the majority of population (89.1% in Preševo and 61% in Bujanovac according to the 2002 census). In the municipality of Medveđa, Albanians are second largest ethnic group (after Serbs), and their participation in this municipality was 32% in 1981 census, 28.67% in 1991 and 26.17% in 2002. The region of Bujanovac and Preševo is widely known as the Preševo Valley (Serbian: Прешевска Долина, Preševska Dolina, Albanian: Lugina e Preshevës).

History

Late antiquity
In late antiquity, the contact zone between Late Proto-Albanian and Balkan Latin was located in eastern and southeastern Serbia. This area included Nish, a city in southeastern Serbia. The toponym Niš in Slavic evolved from a toponym attested in Ancient Greek as ΝΑΙΣΣΟΣ (Naissos), which achieved its present form via phonetic changes in Proto-Albanian and thereafter entered Slavic. This indicates that Proto-Albanians lived in the region in pre-Slavic times. When this settlement happened is a matter of debate, as Proto-Albanians might have moved relatively late in antiquity in the area which might have been an eastern expansion of Proto-Albanian settlement as no other toponyms known in antiquity in the immediate area presuppose an Albanian development. The development of Nish < Naiss- may also represent a regional development in late antiquity Balkans which while related may not be identical with Albanian. The potential spread of the Albanian language in the pre-Slavic era was possibly up to Drobeta-Turnu Severin on the banks of the Danube. Proto-Albanian speakers in the wider region shifted to Balkan Latin and contributed to the emergence of Proto-Romanian populations. The Torlak Slavic dialects are influenced by the features which emerged in the Albanian and Balkan Romance spoken in southeastern Serbia.

Middle Ages
Toponyms such as Arbanaška and Đjake shows an Albanian presence in the Toplica and Southern Morava regions (located north-east of contemporary Kosovo) since the Late Middle Ages. Albanians in the Niš region had been living there for at least 500 years prior to their expulsion, meaning that Albanians would have been present in Niš since the 1300s at the very least. By 1477, part of the Albanian Mataruge tribe lived in the kaza of Prijepolje, where they formed their own distinct community (nahiye) with 10 villages (katund). In Ottoman records on the regions of Toplica, Kruševac and Leskovac (today located in southern Serbia) that date between 1444 and 1446, a village by the name of Tanuš (derived from the Albanian anthroponym Tanush) appears. In the region of Toplica specifically, several settlements of Albanian toponomy were recorded during the first half of the 15th century, such as Gonzi, Castrat, Spanzi, Zur, Katun and Kriva Feja. All of these settlements are indeed older than and predate the time of their recording during the first half of the 15th century.

Ottoman era 
In 1700, after the Great Serb Migration, the Kelmendi and Kuçi and other tribes like the Shkreli of Rugova established themselves in the region of Rožaje and the neighboring town of Tutin, Serbia. The Shala, Krasniqi, and Gashi also moved in the region. Starting in the 18th century many people originating from the Hoti tribe have migrated to and live in Sandžak, mainly in the Tutin area, but also in Sjenica.

In the era of trade development in the Ottoman Balkans, Albanian merchants from Shkodra, Pristina and Prizren had settled in the sanjak of Smederevo (Belgrade Pashalik). Groups of Albanians from Kosovo settled in the areas of Karanovac (today, Kraljevo) and Ćuprija. Albanians were the most significant non-Slavic group of the Smederevo region, the second biggest Muslim group of the pashalik and part of its Muslim population with Muslim Serbs, Bosniaks and smaller communities. In urban areas, Albanians lived in the towns of Paraćin, Ćuprija, Aleksinac, Kruševac and Karanovac. Austrian sources that in Karanovac there were 89 Turkish and Albanian and 11 Serb households. The biggest concentration of Albanians was in Ćuprija, where contemporary Serb author Joakim Vujić recorded more "Turkish Arnauts than Serbs" in 1826. Albanian villages of Smederevo were concentrated in the south and east of the region.

19th century

In the first decades of the Principality of Serbia, which included modern-day central and eastern Serbia, the population was about 85% Serb and 15% non-Serb.  Of those, most were Vlachs, and there were some Muslim Albanians, which were the overwhelming majority of the Muslims that lived in Smederevo, Kladovo and Ćuprija. The new state aimed to homogenize of its population. As a result, from 1830 to the wars of the 1870s, it has been estimated that up to 150,000 Albanians that lived in the territories of the Principality of Serbia had been expelled. In the correspondence of Miloš Obrenović there many indications as to how this process was carried out. Obrenović asked his official Milosav Zdravković to buy the houses of Albanians at a higher price than the market one and ordered the expulsion of Mulims - most of whom were Albanians - from western Serbia. The residences of these population were burnt and they were moved to Ottoman lands.

Albanians in the territories which were included in the Kingdom of Serbia after 1912 were concentrated in three regions: Kosovo, Sandzak and the sanjak of Niš. Albanians were the majority of the population of Toplica (including Kuršumlija and Prokuplje), a significant part of the population of Leskovac and Vranje, and a part of the Muslim community in Niš. A small Albanian community lived in Tran. In the cities, a part of the Muslim population which were identified as Turks were in fact Albanians who had adopted an Ottoman urban culture. A part of the areas where Albanians lived, was administered under the Pashalik of Vranje. In 1843–1844, the pashalik was engulfed by the uprising of Dervish Cara against Huseyin Pasha of Vranje. After the Tanzimat reforms, the local authorities exploited the situation in order to impose heavier taxation and abuse their authority even more against the majority of the population, which were peasant farmers. One particular event which aggravated even more the relations between the locals and Huseyin Pasha is the ban on opening Albanian language schools in the district of Vranje even though the Tanzimat constitution allowed the opening of schools in the mother tongue of every ethnic community in the Ottoman Empire. In April 1844, rebels from the Preševo valley, Gjilan, Leskovac, Tetovo, Gostivar, Kumanovo defeated Huseyin pasha and took Vranje. The Ottoman army sent more than 10,000 troops with artillery support to suppress the rebellion. Local Albanians were led by Sulejman Tola of Veliki Trnovac/Tërrnoc, Selman Rogaçica, Ymer Aga of Presheva and Dervish Cara. The decisive battle which the Ottomans won and ended the rebellion took place on the Somolica hill between Preševo and Bujanovac.

The sanjak of Niš became the subject of territorial dispute in Serbian-Ottoman War (1876–1878). In the war Albanians from Kuršumlja, Prokuplje and Leskovac formed units which operated independently from the Ottoman army for the self-defense of villages against the Serbian troops. Albanian units joined the Ottoman frontline defense from Kosovo and Macedonia. The war caused the displacement of tens of thousands of civilians. More than 35,000 displaced Albanian civilians died just in the winter of 1876–1877.

In the first stages (1876–1877) of the war the Ottoman army won and enacted harsh repressive measures in Serbia. The entry of Russia (Russo-Turkish War (1877–1878)) in the war changed the situation and the Ottomans shifted their forces towards the eastern front. The Ottoman defeat in the Siege of Plevna (December 1877) secured Russian victory in the war and the Ottoman army retreated on all fronts. Ottoman forces surrendered Niš on 10 January 1878 and Serbian forces continued their southwest advance entering the valleys of Kosanica, Pusta Reka and Jablanica. Serbian forces in the Morava Valley continued to head for Vranje, with the intention of then turning west and entering Kosovo proper. The Serbian advance in the southwest was slow, due to the hilly terrain and much resistance by local Albanians who were defending their villages and also sheltering in the nearby Radan and Majdan mountain ranges. Serbian forces took these villages one by one and most remained vacant. Albanian refugees continued to retreat toward Kosovo and their march was halted at the Goljak Mountains when an armistice was declared. The Serbian army operating in the Morava Valley continued south toward two canyons: Grdelica (between Vranje and Leskovac) and Veternica (southwest of Grdelica). After Grdelica was taken, Serbian forces took Vranje. Local Albanians had left with their belongings prior to Serbian forces reaching the town, and other countryside Albanians experienced tensions with Serbian neighbours who fought against and eventually evicted them from the area. Albanian refugees defended the Veternica canyon, before retreating toward the Goljak mountains. Albanians who lived nearby in the Masurica region did not resist Serbian forces and General Jovan Belimarković refused to carry out orders from Belgrade to deport them, but they were deported with other Albanians after Belimarković moved out of Masurica.

As a result of the  territorial expansion of the Principality of Serbia in 1877–78, massive and violent expulsion of Albanians occurred from the newly occupied regions in the sanjak of Niš. In the new areas (present-day Jablanica, Toplica and parts of Nišava District) an estimated 50,000–60,000 Albanians were expelled and settled mainly in Kosovo. Between the Ottoman-Serbian armistice and the final act of the Congress of Berlin, some Albanian groups had returned to their homes. After the treaty of Berlin was signed, they were expelled to Turkey. In total, around 600 Albanian villages in the were ethnically cleansed. Albanians who settled in Kosovo and other regions became known as muhaxhirs (refugees). The events of 1877-78 marked the beginning of the modern Serbian-Albanian conflict.

The expulsion and ethnic cleansing of Albanians from southern Serbia was the result of a policy of ethnic homogenization of the Serbian state and reflected Serbia's strategic goal of expanding southwards to Macedonia and Old Serbia. In Serbian geopolitical strategy, Albanians were seen as an "undesirable and unreliable population" which had to be replaced with a "reliable" population. Orthodox Serbs, Herzegovinians and Montenegrins were invited to settle in the depopulated areas. A part of the Serb settlers came from nearby eastern Kosovo and had been driven out in interethnic violence by the muhaxhirs who had settled just across the new border. The large depopulation and economic devaluation of the new territories couldn't be balanced by any means so the Serbian government attempted to attract some of the Albanians who had been expelled to settle again in Serbia. Milan Obrenović, future King of Serbia since 1882, struck a deal directly with Shahid Pasha, a local Albanian military officer from Jablanica. Shahid Pasha was commander of the Ottoman barracks of Sofia in the 1877–78 war. Under the agreement, some Muslim Albanians returned to Gornja Jablanica (Medveđa).

Early 20th century

During the Balkan wars, the Kosovo Vilayet and Sandžak became part of Serbia. Tens of thousands of Albanian civilians were massacred and expelled from the newly conquered territories. In Novi Pazar, General Petar Živković targeted the Albanians of the region. Many journalists who including Leon Trotsky, Leo Freundlich observed and recorded the events. Danish journalist Fritz Magnussen recorded the slaughter of 5,000 Albanians near Pristina.

In the Kingdom of Yugoslavia, Albanians were divided in three banovinas (counties): Vardar Banovina, Zeta Banovina and Morava Banovina since 1929. The Albanians of modern-day southern Serbia were within Vardar Macedonia. In Titoist Yugoslavia, the Preševo valley didn't become part of the Autonomous Province of Kosovo but part of Yugoslav Serbia. This decision was influenced by the location of transport infrastructure near Preševo. In Albanian politics, Preševo continues to be called "eastern Kosovo".

Federal Republic of Yugoslavia and Serbia (1990–)
In 1992, the Albanian representatives in the municipalities Preševo, Medveđa and Bujanovac organized a referendum in which they voted for the joining of these municipalities to the self-declared assembly of the Republic of Kosova. However, no major events happened until the end of the 1990s.

Following the breakup of Yugoslavia, and nearby Kosovo War which lasted until 1999, between 1999 and 2001, an ethnic Albanian paramilitary separatist organization, the UÇPMB, raised an armed insurgency in the Preševo Valley, in the region mostly inhabited by Albanians, with a goal to occupy these three municipalities from Serbia and join them to (future independent) Kosovo.

The Serbian media during Milošević's era was known to espouse Serb nationalism while promoting xenophobia toward the other ethnicities in Yugoslavia. Ethnic Albanians were commonly characterized in the media as anti-Yugoslav counter-revolutionaries, rapists, and a threat to the Serb nation. During the Kosovo War, Serbian forces continually discriminating Kosovo Albanians:

A survey in Serbia showed that 40% of the Serbian population would not like Albanians to live in Serbia while 70% would not enter into a marriage with an Albanian individual the same exists in Albania towards Serbs.

Unlike in the case of Kosovo, western countries condemned the attacks and described it as the "extremism" and use of "illegal terrorist actions" by the group. Following the overthrow of Slobodan Milošević, the new Serbian government suppressed the violence by 2001 and defeated the separatists. NATO troops also helped the Serbian government by ensuring that the rebels do not import the conflicts back into Kosovo, and even supported Serbia's military suppression of Albanians in their country, as an act to restore the relations with Serbia after 1999 bombing. This has left a dark chapter on Albania's relations with NATO, although Albania later joined the organization.

Since then, the Albanian Coalition from Preševo Valley has gained representation in the National Assembly of Serbia where it holds two seats. In 2009, Serbia opened a military base Cepotina 5 kilometers south of Bujanovac, to further stabilize the area.

On 7 March 2017, the President of Albania Bujar Nishani made a historical visit to the municipalities of Preševo and Bujanovac, in which Albanians form the ethnic majority.
On 26 November 2017, the President of Albania Ilir Meta made a historical visit to Medveđa, municipality with Albanian ethnic minority.
On 26 November 2019, an earthquake struck Albania. Albanians of the Preševo valley donated aid and sent it through several convoys to earthquake victims.

In 2021 the Helsinki Committee for Human Rights in Serbia released a report which stated that the Serbian administration was undertaking a "passivation of residence of Albanians" resulting in Albanians living in Southern Serbia losing the right to vote, their property, health insurance, pension and employment. According to the committee, this measure amounted to "ethnic cleansing through administrative means".

Culture

Education

The first Albanian language school in the Preševo valley was opened in Preševo on February 7, 1945. It was opened by Abdulla Krashnica, local anti-fascist partisan. The first secondary school was opened in 1948.

Media
Before the 2001 rebellion, no Albanian-language media were allowed in the Preševo valley. The first Albanian-language channel was allowed after the Končulj Agreement (2001).
In 2003, the state TV channel of Preševo began to broadcast in Albanian. Another regional state channel in Bujanovac broadcasts 8 hours (out of a total 16) daily in Albanian. A private TV channel which broadcasts mostly in Albanian was funded in 2006. "Radio Presheva" broadcasts 10 hours in Albanian daily. A similar station exists in Bujanovac. In Medveđa, the local state channel broadcasts 5 minutes in Albanian daily and one weekly 60-minute show in Albanian.

Religion 
The main religion of Albanians in the Preševo Valley is Islam. Prior to the Ottoman period, the population of the region was mostly Roman Catholic. There are still Catholic churches in the Karadak villages, located in Kosovo today.

Demographics 
Albanians boycotted the 1991 census in Serbia and Kosovo. In 2002, they took part in the census according to the Končulj Agreement which terminated the insurgency in the Preševo Valley. The 2002 census counted 61,647 Albanians in Serbia. In the 2011 census, the Albanian community in the Preševo Valley largely boycotted the census in protest against the lack of progress in the implementation of Končulj Agreement. According to the census, the total number of Albanians in Serbia is 5,805. According to the 2011 census, 71.1% of all Albanians are Muslim, followed by Catholics (16.8%) and Orthodox Christians (2.6%). The remainder did not declare their religion or belong to smaller religious groups (9.5%). A few years later, independent experts estimated the size of their population to ca. 75,000. Albanian community leaders claim that there about 25,000 more Albanians from Serbia. Belgrade, capital of Serbia, has a small Albanian community. In the census of 1981, 8,212 Albanians were registered. In 1991 there lived only 4,985 Albanians in Belgrade. After the Kosovo War, this number decreased to 1,492, and according to the latest census (2011), the number is 1,252. During the 2022 census, the Helsinki Committee 
of Serbia declared that the passivization of residences of Albanians could be used as a means to not allow them to register in the census and as a consequence the census could serve as "a mechanism for the disenfranchisement of Albanians in southern Serbia". About 100,000 Albanians in total were recorded in the preliminary results of the census, most of them in the Preševo Valley.

Albanians in Sandžak (divided between Serbia and Montenegro) made up a considerable portion of the population of the region but today only a few villages identify as Albanian, mainly as the result of cultural assimilation and immigration. The Bulgarian foreign ministry compiled a report about the region in 1901–02. In areas of Sandžak which today are part of Serbia, the kaza of Sjenica was inhabited mainly by Orthodox Serbs (69 villages with 624 households) and Bosnian Muslims (46 villages with 655 households). Albanians (505 households) lived exclusively in the town of Sjenica. The kaza of Novi Pazar had 1,749 households in 244 Serb villages and 896 households in 81 Albanian villages. Nine villages inhabited by both Serbs and Albanians had 173 households. The town of Novi Pazar had a total of 1,749 Serb and Albanian households with 8,745 inhabitants. The kaza of Novi Varoš, according the Bulgarian report, was mostly Serbian with the exception of one Muslim Bosnian village and Albanian households in the town of Novi Varoš. The last official registration of the population of the sanjak of Novi Pazar before the Balkan Wars was conducted in 1910. The 1910 Ottoman census recorded 52,833 Muslims and 27,814 Orthodox Serbs. About 65% of the population were Muslims and 35% Serbian Orthodox. The majority of the Muslim population were Albanians. In the 21st century, there still is a small community which identifies as Albanian in the Pešter region of Sandžak living in villages such as Boroštica, Doliće and Ugao. For the past two generations these villages have opted to declare themselves "Bosniak" in the national census. This partial bosniakicisation and abandonment of the self-designation Albanian has been attributed to a strategy by the villagers to avoid ethnic violence by Serbian para-military groups in the Yugoslavs wars and partially due to intermarriage with the surrounding Bosniak population. As such and also due to the Yugoslav wars and thereafter, they have opted to declare themselves in censuses as "Muslims"  and "Bosniaks" instead of as Albanians to avoid problems. Elders in these villages are still fluent in Albanian. Catholic Albanian groups which settled in the early 18th century were converted to Islam in that period. Their descendants make up the large majority of the population of Tutin and the Pešter plateau.

Notable people

See also

 Albania–Serbia relations
 Serbo-Montenegrins in Albania
 Albanians in Kosovo
 Albanians in Montenegro
 Albanians in North Macedonia

Notes

References

Sources

External links
 Southern Serbia: In Kosovo's Shadow

 
Ethnic groups in Serbia
Albania–Serbia relations
Albanian communities in Serbia
Muslim communities in Europe